Louis Koo Tin-lok (born 21 October 1970) is a Hong Kong actor, singer and film producer. He began his professional career as an actor in local television series, winning TVB's Best Actor award in 1999 and 2001. After 2001, he fully focused on film career and became one of the stalwarts of the Hong Kong film industry. In 2018, Koo was awarded the Hong Kong Film Award for Best Actor, Asian Film Award for Best Actor and the Hong Kong Film Directors' Guild Award for Best Actor for his performance in the 2017 film Paradox.

Early life
Koo's father was an actor and then changed career to a businessman. Koo was born and received education in Hong Kong. He is an alumnus of St. Teresa's School Kowloon and Carmel Secondary School.

Teenage life
Koo, along with his friends, were convicted by the court because of robbing in November 1990. Koo was sentenced to 22 months in the Correctional Services Lai King Training Centre. He neither mentioned nor acknowledged the event to the public after joining the entertainment industry, only after being exposed by the media in 1994.

Career
During 1992 to 1993, Koo was a modelling agent, sometimes he worked as a model for advertisements and karaoke videos.

Television actor
In 1993, Koo signed as a contract artist with TVB (Television Broadcasts Limited).

Koo started gaining wide recognition in 1995 with his leading role in a costume drama The Condor Heroes 95, a popular series based on a classic wuxia novel. In 1997, Koo began sporting an extreme tan (for which he is well known), which apparently enabled him to take on more contemporary roles. In 1999, Koo received TVB's Most Popular Actor Award for Detective Investigation Files IV. In 2000, Koo received TVB's Most Favorite Character Award for At the Threshold of an Era ll. Koo took a different approach to his role in A Step Into the Past. This deviation from his usual cool aloof on-screen persona to a funnier, carefree and down-to-earth one resonated with the audience and widened his acting range. In 2001, Koo was given TVB's Most Popular Actor Award and Favorite Character Award Award once again for A Step into the Past. He then went on an indefinite hiatus from television and has since focused on his film career.

Due to the popularity of TVB dramas in the late 1990s, Koo amassed a sizeable fan base in Hong Kong, Taiwan, mainland China and South-east Asia.

Film actor
Since 1994, Koo began taking on roles in films, such as the paranormal Troublesome Night series and many action films including Wilson Yip's Bullets Over Summer (1999). Koo acted as a mute boy living on rural island in romantic literary film Sealed with a Kiss (1998).

During 2001 to 2004, Koo signed contract with China Star Entertainment Group and starred in many romantic comedies, such as La Brassiere and Naked Ambition.

In 2004, Koo took on the role of Sze-to Bo, a perpetually drunk and despondent former judo champion with hereditary eye disease, in Johnnie To’s Throw Down which was premiered at the 61st Venice International Film Festival. The movie was a marked departure from his usual commercial genres, and he also began his long-term collaboration with To and Milkyway Image.

Koo later received international acclaim for his chilling performance in Johnnie To's Election 2 (a.k.a. Triad Election), which was screened at the "Out of Competition" section at the 59th Cannes Film Festival (Election was competitive film at the 58th Cannes Film Festival). He won the award for Most Beloved Actor in the Hong Kong UA Film Awards 2006 through public voting for his role in Election 2.

In a female perspective romantic film Happy Birthday (2006) adapted by Sylvia Chang from 'Rene Liu's novella, Koo portrayed a sensitive man who continued to take care of his ex-girlfriend after his death.

Koo also took supporting roles in action movies, such as  Jackie Chan's Robin B Hood (2006), Donnie Yen's Flash Point (2007).

His character as an unscrupulous drug addict in Derek Yee's Protégé (2007) differed from his previous performances, as he forwent his suave image for an emaciated look. The supporting role earned him positive critical feedback and Best Supporting Actor nominations at the Hong Kong Film Awards and the Golden Horse Awards.

In Sylvia Chang's female perspective gangster film Run Papa Run (2008), Koo played a reckless triad leader who tried to shield his daughter from his past misdemeanours. Koo earned Best Actor nominations in the Hong Kong Film Awards and  Golden Horse Award for this role, which required him to portray a character from his late teens to his fifties. Since then Koo took more challenging father roles and middle-aged roles.

In the remake of Cellular, Connected (2008) directed by Benny Chan, he played an average Joe cast in a race against time to save a stranger.

In Soi Cheang's Accident (2009) which was a competitive film at the 66th Venice International Film Festival, Koo acted as a highly-strung killer-group leader who was good at disguising murders as accidents.

In Overheard (2009) directed by Alan Mak and Felix Chong, he put on 30 pounds’ weight to take the role of a middle-aged cop and father of four more convincingly, and  earned Best Actor nominations in Hong Kong Film Critics Society Awards. This film was successful and was then made into a series with the same cast and directors but different stories.

In 2010 Koo signed pre-paid contracts with Pegasus Motion Pictures, then appeared in its All's well, ends well comedy series, and it's anti-corruption film series (Z Storm, S Storm).

In costume A Chinese Ghost Story (2011), Koo acted as a Chinese Taoist "Exorcist" who fell in love with a fox-fairy and sacrificed himself in the end. Koo made a return to his romantic comedy roots in Don't Go Breaking My Heart  and sequel Don't Go Breaking My Heart 2 (2014) directed by Johnnie To and Wai Ka-Hui, acting as a dissolute stock broker.

In Drug War (2012) directed by Johnnie To, Koo took on the role of a ruthless and deliberate Hong Kong drug lord who dared to do anything to get away from mainland China's death penalty.

Koo received a Hong Kong Film Award for Best Actor nomination again for his undercover cop role in Benny Chan's 2013 film The White Storm.

In Out of Inferno (2013), Koo acted as a resigned firefighter who encountered a fire in a high-rise building.

In Overheard 3 (2014), he acted as a revenger with artificial limb.

In Soi Cheang's SPL II: A Time for Consequences (2015), Koo took the role of an ill and evil mastermind of a criminal organization. In Johnnie To's Three (2016), Koo acted as a cop leader at the edge of crime.

In Shed Skin Papa (2017), a competitive film at the 29th Tokyo International Film Festival, Koo acted as a frustrated director who came to understand his father after his mother's funeral and a series of fantastic incidents.

In Paradox (2017), Koo played a cop who was determined to avenge his daughter, and performed most of the film's action sequences without the use of a stunt double. For his performance in the film, Koo won Asian Film Award for Best Actor at the 12th Asian Film Awards as well the Hong Kong Film Directors' Guild Award for Best Actor at the 12th Hong Kong Film Directors' Guild Award in March 2018. Koo's performance also won him the Best Actor award at the 37th Hong Kong Film Awards held on 15 April 2018.

Film producer
Koo was captivated by Star Wars film series when he was a child. After a decades-long acting career in the film industry, he anticipated the rise of China's own Sci-fi films, so he purchased several Visual effects and Prosthetic make-up companies. In 2013, Koo founded "One Cool Group Limited". As of 2018, One Cool Group has produced 20 films. The sci-fi action film Warriors of Future, which Koo produced and stars in, was released on 25 August 2022.

One Cool Group was to set up an entertainment company with Media Asia in 2021, forming a new group named Cool Style.  Investors included Hong Kong model and actress Angelababy Yang Ying, Angelababy's agent Kim Chou and Hong Kong film director Stephen Fung’s production company Film Magic Pictures.  Cool Style's business scope includes artist management and related businesses aiming to cultivate new forces with abundant resources and platforms.

Koo was able to acquire the rights of the series A Step into the Past in 2015 and adapt it for the big screen - Back to the Past.  Production for the film officially wrapped on 7 July 2019.  Koo will also star in the film reprising his role from the series.

In 2021, Koo served as executive producer for two Hollywood animation films, The Mitchells vs. the Machines and Vivo, with the former being nominated for the Academy Award for Best Animated Feature at the 94th Academy Awards.

Social work in film industry
Koo has been the ambassador of Hong Kong International Film Festival from 2014 to 2018.

In 2015, Koo joined the board of Fresh Wave International Short Film Festival held in Hong Kong.

In Jan 2018, Koo was elected as the president of Hong Kong Performing Artistes Guild.

Other works

Writer
Koo has published several books over the years including his photo albums Present (1999) and Cool (2001), as well as his autobiography Find Happiness (2002). He also released Toys Battle (2008), a book chronicling his love for comic book characters and movie superheroes, and donated all proceeds to UNICEF. Koo has been writing blogs everyday on his own website since December 2006.

Singer
Koo recorded several theme songs for the TVB dramas he had starred in and several TV advertisement songs he had endorsed. He had also cut four albums: Boyfriend and Popular Louis in 2000, optimism in 2001, Mr.Cool in 2003.

Designer
Koo was a designer of his own eyewear brand ZeroX, Level Nine, and Louis Koo. He also participated in designs of his own books, websites, company logos and some endorsed brands.

Brand spokesperson
With a career spanning two decades, Koo has endorsed a large number of brands in Hong Kong and Mainland China. Some of the major brand endorsements include, Pepsi, Brooks Brothers, Samsung Galaxy, Xbox 360 Kinect, Toyota Corolla, Yokohama Tire, Lay's, Lipton, Lotte chewing gum, Tropicana, Gillette, OSIM, Tag Heuer, Epson printer, Matisse, Johnnie Walker, Pentax camera, Clinique, Hugo Boss Perfume, Bally, Puma, DBS Black World MasterCard.

Charity
In July 2012, Chinese microblogs caught on to the news of Koo's low profile philanthropy in China, which became a trending topic, more and more people born in different remote rural areas found that local elementary schools were built with donation of Koo, and upload photos to the microblogs. Major Chinese dailies further reported that he had helped build 49 schools to help the underprivileged in remote areas in rural China for the past three years without any publicity. Koo was reluctant to comment on the issue but it was learnt that Koo set up his charity foundation after witnessing the devastation from the Sichuan earthquake in 2008. According to "Grace charity" website, Koo has helped build 97 elementary school buildings, 18 clinics and 751 small water supply projects in remote undeveloped areas of rural China through "Grace Charity Foundation Limited" and local government by 2017.

Koo is also a UNICEF (United Nations International Children's Emergency Fund) ambassador since 2007.

Filmography

Film

Television

Honors 

In 2018, 55382 Kootinlok, a main-belt asteroid discovered by Bill Yeung at the Desert Eagle Observatory in 2001, was named in honor of Koo.

On May 20, 2021, Weibo Starlight Awards 2020 ceremony was held online. The winners were all over the world, including Koo, Katy Perry, Taylor Swift, Takuya Kimura, etc.　Koo, was awarded the "Starlight of Fame (Hong Kong, Macau and Taiwan)" and  "Starlight Influential Actor of the Year".

References

External links

KooTinLok.com - Official Fans Club website for Louis Koo
Louis Koo at EntGroup.cn
Louis Koo Tin-Lok at LoveHKFilm.com
HK cinemagic entry
JayneStars.com - English translated news about Louis Koo
Louis Koo's Official Instagram

1970 births
Living people
Cantopop singers
Hong Kong male film actors
Hong Kong Mandopop singers
Hong Kong male singers
Hong Kong male television actors
Hong Kong television presenters
Hong Kong film producers
TVB actors
20th-century Hong Kong male actors
21st-century Hong Kong male actors
Best Actor Asian Film Award winners
Hong Kong male comedians
Hong Kong idols